Margarinotus purpurascens is a species of clown beetle in the family Histeridae. It is found in Europe and Northern Asia (excluding China), North America, and Southern Asia.

References

Further reading

External links

 

Histeridae
Beetles of Asia
Beetles of Europe
Beetles of North America
Taxa named by Johann Friedrich Wilhelm Herbst
Beetles described in 1791
Articles created by Qbugbot